Simone Maria Morgado Ferreira (born 6 April 1967) is a Brazilian politician and economists. She has spent her political career representing her home state of Pará, having served as federal deputy representative from 2015 to 2019.

Personal life
Morgado was born to Hilário Augusto Ferreira Filho and Maria Amália Morgado Ferreira. In addition to being a politician, Morgado has also worked as an economist. She is the spouse of fellow politician Jader Barbalho.

Political career
Morgado voted against the impeachment of then-president Dilma Rousseff. Morgado voted against the 2015 tax reforms but in favor of the 2017 Brazilian labor reform, and would vote against the opening of a corruption investigation into Rousseff's successor Michel Temer. Morgado was one of the strongest supporters of Temer against his corruption allegations.

References 

1967 births
Living people
People from Belém
Brazilian economists
Brazilian women economists
Brazilian Democratic Movement politicians
Members of the Chamber of Deputies (Brazil) from Pará
Members of the Legislative Assembly of Pará
Brazilian women in politics